Nikolsky District is an administrative and municipal district (raion), one of the twenty-seven in Penza Oblast, Russia. It is located in the northeast of the oblast. Its administrative center is the town of Nikolsk. Population: 34,271 (2010 Census);  The population of Nikolsk accounts for 65.6% of the district's total population.

References

Notes

Sources

Districts of Penza Oblast